Jack Beaumont may refer to:

 Jack Beaumont (cricketer) (1855–1920), English cricketer
 Jack Beaumont (footballer) (born 1994), Scottish footballer
 Jack Beaumont (rower) (born 1993), British rower